Gus Green Van Sant Jr. (born July 24, 1952) is an American film director, producer, photographer, and musician. He has earned acclaim as both an independent and mainstream filmmaker. His films typically deal with themes of marginalized subcultures, in particular homosexuality. Van Sant is considered one of the most prominent auteurs of the New Queer Cinema movement.

His early career was devoted to directing television commercials in the Pacific Northwest. He made his feature-length cinematic directorial debut with Mala Noche (1985). His second feature, Drugstore Cowboy (1989), was highly acclaimed, and earned him screenwriting awards from the Los Angeles Film Critics Association and New York Film Critics Circle and the award for Best Director from the National Society of Film Critics. His next film, My Own Private Idaho (1991), was similarly praised, as was the black comedy To Die For (1995), the drama Good Will Hunting (1997), and the biographical film Milk (2008); for the latter two, Van Sant was nominated for the Academy Award for Best Director and both films received Best Picture nominations.

In 2003, Van Sant's film based on the Columbine High School massacre, Elephant, won the Palme d'Or at the Cannes Film Festival. Van Sant also received the festival's Best Director Award that same year, making him one of only two filmmakers—the other being Joel Coen—to win both accolades at the festival in the same year. Though most of Van Sant's other films received favourable reviews, such as Finding Forrester (2000) and Paranoid Park (2007), some of his efforts, such as the art house production Last Days (2005) and the environmental drama Promised Land (2012), have received more mixed reviews from critics, while his adaptation of Tom Robbins's Even Cowgirls Get the Blues (1993), his 1998 remake of Alfred Hitchcock's Psycho, and The Sea of Trees (2015), were critical and commercial failures.

Van Sant wrote the screenplays for several of his earlier works, and is the author of a novel, Pink. A book of his photography, 108 Portraits, has been published, and he has released two musical albums.

He is gay and lives in the Los Feliz section of Los Angeles, California.

Early life
Van Sant was born and raised in Louisville, Kentucky, the son of Betty (née Seay) and Gus Green Van Sant Sr; Gus's father was a clothing manufacturer and traveling salesman, who rapidly worked his way into middle class prosperity, holding executive marketing positions that included being president of the White Stag Manufacturing Company's Apparel Operation. As a result of his father's job, the family moved continually during Van Sant's childhood.

His paternal family is of partial Dutch origin; the name "Van Sant" is derived from the Dutch name "Van Zandt". The earliest Van Zandt arrived in the New Netherland area in the early 17th century, around what is now New York City.

Van Sant is an alumnus of Darien High School in Darien, Connecticut, and The Catlin Gabel School in Portland, Oregon. One constant in the director's early years was his interest in visual arts (namely, painting and Super-8 filmmaking); while still in school he began making semi-autobiographical shorts costing between 30 and 50 dollars. Van Sant's artistic leanings took him to the Rhode Island School of Design in 1970, where his introduction to various avant-garde directors inspired him to change his major from painting to cinema.

Career

1982–1989: Early career
After spending time in Europe, Van Sant went to Los Angeles in 1976. He secured a job as a production assistant to filmmaker Ken Shapiro, with whom he developed a few ideas, none of which came to fruition. In 1981, Van Sant made Alice in Hollywood, a film about a naïve young actress who goes to Hollywood and abandons her ideals. It was never released. During this period, Van Sant began to spend time observing the denizens of the more down-and-out sections of Hollywood Boulevard. He became fascinated by the existence of this marginalized section of L.A.'s population, especially in context with the more ordinary, prosperous world that surrounded them. Van Sant would repeatedly focus his work on those existing on society's fringes, making his feature film directorial debut Mala Noche.

It was made two years after Van Sant went to New York to work in an advertising agency. He saved $20,000 during his tenure there, enabling him to finance the majority of his tale of doomed love between a gay liquor store clerk and a Mexican immigrant. The film, which was taken from Portland street writer Walt Curtis' semi-autobiographical novella, featured some of the director's hallmarks, notably an unfulfilled romanticism, a dry sense of the absurd, and the refusal to treat homosexuality as something deserving of judgment. Unlike many gay filmmakers, Van Sant—who had long been openly gay—declined to use same-sex relationships as fodder for overtly political statements, although such relationships would frequently appear in his films.

Shot in black-and-white, the film earned Van Sant almost overnight acclaim on the festival circuit, with the Los Angeles Times naming it the year's best independent film. The film's success attracted Hollywood interest, and Van Sant was briefly courted by Universal; the courtship ended after Van Sant pitched a series of project ideas (including what would become Drugstore Cowboy and My Own Private Idaho) that the studio declined to take interest in.

Van Sant returned to Portland, Oregon, where he set up house and began giving life to the ideas rejected by Universal. He directed Drugstore Cowboy about four drug addicts robbing pharmacies to support their habit. The film met with great critical success and revived the career of Matt Dillon.

1990–1995: Indie and arthouse success
Drugstore Cowboys exploration of the lives of those living on society's outer fringes, as well as its Portland setting, were mirrored in Van Sant's next effort, the similarly acclaimed My Own Private Idaho (1991). Only with the success of Cowboy was Van Sant now given license to make Idaho (a film he had originally pitched that was knocked back several times because the studios deemed the script 'too risky'). New Line Cinema now gave Van Sant the green light, and he went on a mission to get the Idaho script into the hands of River Phoenix and Keanu Reeves, his preferred choice for the two young leads. After months of struggle with agents and managers over the content of the script, Van Sant finally secured Phoenix and Reeves, who played the roles of Mike Waters and Scott Favor, respectively.

Centering on the dealings of two male hustlers (played by Phoenix and Reeves), the film was a compelling examination of unrequited love, alienation and the concept of family (a concept Van Sant repeatedly explores in his films). The film won him an Independent Spirit Award for his screenplay (he had won the same award for his Drugstore Cowboy screenplay), as well as greater prestige. The film gained River Phoenix best actor honors at the Venice Film Festival among others. It helped Reeves—previously best known for his work in the Bill and Ted movies—to get the critical respect that had eluded him.

Van Sant's next film, a 1993 adaptation of Tom Robbins' Even Cowgirls Get the Blues, was an excessive flop, both commercially and critically. Featuring an unusually large budget (for Van Sant, at least) of $8.5 million and a large, eclectic cast including Uma Thurman, John Hurt, Keanu Reeves and a newcomer in the form of River Phoenix's younger sister Rain (at Phoenix's suggestion), the film was worked and then reworked, but the finished product nonetheless resulted in something approaching a significant disaster.

Van Sant's 1995 film To Die For helped to restore his luster. An adaptation of Joyce Maynard's novel, the black comedy starred Nicole Kidman as a murderously ambitious weather girl; it also stars Matt Dillon as her hapless husband and, the third Phoenix sibling in as many projects, Joaquin Phoenix, as her equally hapless lover (River had died of a drug overdose a year and half earlier). It was Van Sant's first effort for a major studio (Columbia), and its success paved the way for further projects of the director's choosing. The same year, he served as executive producer for Larry Clark's Kids; it was a fitting assignment, due to both the film's subject matter and the fact that Clark's photographs of junkies had served as reference points for Van Sant's Drugstore Cowboy.

1997–2003: Mainstream breakout
In 1997, Van Sant gained mainstream recognition and critical acclaim thanks to Good Will Hunting, which was written by Matt Damon and Ben Affleck. The film, about a troubled, blue-collar mathematical genius, was a huge critical and commercial success. It was nominated for nine Academy Awards, including Best Director for Van Sant. It won two, including Best Screenplay for Damon and Affleck, and Best Supporting Actor Oscar for Robin Williams, who, in his acceptance speech, referred to Van Sant as "being so subtle you're almost subliminal." Van Sant, Damon and Affleck parodied themselves and the film's success in Kevin Smith's Jay and Silent Bob Strike Back.

Van Sant received the opportunity to remake Alfred Hitchcock's classic Psycho. As opposed to reinterpreting the 1960 film, Van Sant opted to recreate the film shot-for-shot, in color, with a cast of young Hollywood A-listers. His decision was met with equal parts curiosity, skepticism, and derision from industry insiders and outsiders alike, and the finished result met with a similar reception. It starred Anne Heche, Vince Vaughn and Julianne Moore, and met with a negative critical reception and did poorly at the box office.

In 2000, Van Sant directed Finding Forrester, about a high-school student (Rob Brown) from the Bronx unlikely becoming a friend of a crusty, reclusive author (Sean Connery). Critical response was generally positive and became a box office success.

In addition to directing, he devoted considerable energy to releasing two albums and publishing a novel, Pink, which was a thinly veiled exploration of his grief over River Phoenix's death.

2003–present: Return to arthouse cinema

Van Sant traveled to the deserts of Argentina, Utah, and Death Valley for the production of 2002's Gerry, a loosely devised, largely improvised feature in which stars Matt Damon and Casey Affleck—both playing characters named Gerry—wander through the desert, discussing Wheel of Fortune, video games, and nothing in particular. The film premiered at the Sundance Film Festival.

It took Gerry over a year to make it to theaters, in which time Van Sant began production on his next film, Elephant. Approached by HBO and producer Diane Keaton to craft a fictional film based on the 1999 Columbine High School massacre, the director chose to shoot in his hometown of Portland, employing dozens of untrained, teen actors. Melding improvisational long takes like those in Gerry with Harris Savides' fluid camerawork, the film was influenced by Alan Clarke's 1989 film of the same name (see Elephant). The finished film provoked strong reactions from audiences at the 2003 Cannes Film Festival. At the Cannes festival, the jury awarded Elephant with their top prize, the Palme d'Or, and Van Sant with his first Best Director statue from the festival.

In 2005, Van Sant released Last Days, the final component of what he refers to as his "Death Trilogy", (the other parts being Gerry and Elephant). It is a fictionalized account of what happened to Nirvana frontman Kurt Cobain in the days leading up to his death. In 2006, Van Sant began work on Paranoid Park based on the book by Blake Nelson, about a skateboarding teenager who accidentally causes someone's death. The film was released in Europe in February 2008. He also directed the "Le Marais" segment of the omnibus film Paris, je t'aime.

Released in 2008, Van Sant's Milk is a biopic of openly gay San Francisco politician Harvey Milk, who was assassinated in 1978. The film received eight Oscar nominations at the 81st Academy Awards, including Best Picture, winning two for Best Actor in a Leading Role for Sean Penn, who starred as Milk, and Best Original Screenplay for writer Dustin Lance Black. Van Sant was nominated for Best Director. Van Sant later stated that his experience with Sean Penn on the film was "amazing".

His 2011 film Restless was screened in the Un Certain Regard section at the 2011 Cannes Film Festival, and starred Henry Hopper and Mia Wasikowska.

Van Sant's film, Promised Land, was released on December 28, 2012. The film stars Frances McDormand, Matt Damon, and John Krasinski—the latter two co-wrote the screenplay based on a story by Dave Eggers. Filmed in April 2012, the production company, Focus Features, selected the release date so that the film is eligible to qualify for awards consideration.

Following Promised Land, Van Sant directed a film titled Sea of Trees, which starred Matthew McConaughey and Ken Watanabe. The film tells the story of a man who travels to the infamous Aokigahara suicide forest in Japan to kill himself, only to encounter another man wishing to kill himself as well, with whom he then embarks on a "spiritual journey". The film was selected to compete for the Palme d'Or at the 2015 Cannes Film Festival but was met with harsh critical reception at the Cannes, being booed and laughed at.

In December 2016, it was announced Van Sant would direct Don't Worry, He Won't Get Far on Foot, a biopic about cartoonist John Callahan, starring Joaquin Phoenix, Rooney Mara, Jonah Hill, Jack Black and Mark Webber. Principal photography began in March 2017.

Other work
Van Sant released two musical albums: Gus Van Sant and 18 Songs About Golf. Van Sant played himself in episodes of the HBO series Entourage and the IFC series Portlandia.

Van Sant directed the pilot for the Starz television program Boss, starring Kelsey Grammer. Van Sant went onto The Bret Easton Ellis Podcast to discuss filmmaking, writing, film history and their collaborations that never got made (The Golden Suicides) and the one that did (The Canyons).

Archive
The moving image collection of Gus Van Sant is held at the Academy Film Archive. The archive has preserved many of Van Sant's short films, including The Happy Organ, Ken Death Gets Out of Jail, Five Ways to Kill Yourself, and others.

Awards and nominations
 Career Achievement
 Provincetown International Film Festival Filmmaker on the Edge Award (2002)
 Drugstore Cowboy (1989)
 Los Angeles Film Critics Association Award for Best Screenplay (with Daniel Yost)
 Independent Spirit Award for Best Screenplay (with Daniel Yost)
 National Society of Film Critics Award for Best Director
 National Society of Film Critics Award for Best Screenplay (with Daniel Yost)
 New York Film Critics Circle Award for Best Screenplay (with Daniel Yost)
 My Own Private Idaho (1991)
 Venice Film Festival Official Selection
 Toronto Festival of Festivals FIPRESCI Prize Good Will Hunting (1997)
 Berlin Film Festival Official Selection
 Academy Award nomination for Best Director [film won for Best Supporting Actor and Best Original Screenplay]
 Directors Guild of America (DGA) nomination for Outstanding Directorial Achievement in Motion Pictures
 Satellite Award nomination for Best Director
 Finding Forrester (2000)
 Berlin Film Festival Prize of the Guild of German Art House Cinemas'''
 Elephant (2003)
 Cannes Film Festival Palme d'Or
 Cannes Film Festival Prix de la mise en scène
 Last Days (2005)
 Cannes Film Festival Official Selection
 Paranoid Park (2007)
 Boston Society of Film Critics Award for Best Director
 Cannes Film Festival "Prix du 60ème anniversaire" (also acknowledging his body of works)
 Milk (2008)
Academy Award nomination for Best Director [film won Best Actor in a Leading Role and Best Original Screenplay]
 Boston Society of Film Critics Award for Best Director
 Broadcast Film Critics Association Award nomination for Best Director
 The Cinema for Peace Award for the Most Valuable Film of the Year
Directors Guild of America (DGA) nomination for Outstanding Directorial Achievement in Motion Pictures
Satellite Award nomination for Best Director

Filmography

Feature films

Executive producer only
 Kids (1995)
 Speedway Junky (1999)
 Tarnation (2003)
 Wild Tigers I Have Known (2006)
 Lightfield's Home Videos (2006)
 Howl (2010)
 Virginia (2010)
 Act Up! (2012)
 Laurence Anyways (2012)
 Revolution (2013)
 I Am Michael (2015)
 Age Out (2018)

Short films
 Fun with a Bloodroot (1967) 2 min 20 sec, 8 mm color
 The Happy Organ (1971) 20 min, 16 mm black and white
 Little Johnny (1972) 40 sec, 16 mm black and white
 1/2 of a Telephone Conversation (1973) 2 min, 16 mm black and white
 Late Morning Start (1975) 28 min, 16 mm color
 The Discipline of DE (1978) 9 min, 16 mm black and white, adaptation of William S. Burroughs' short story, narrated by Ken Shapiro
 Alice in Hollywood (1981) 45 min, 16 mm color
 My Friend (1982) 3 min, 16 mm black and white
 Where'd She Go? (1983) 3 min, 16 mm color
 Nightmare Typhoon (1984) 9 min, 16 mm black and white
 My New Friend (1984) 3 min, 16 mm color
 Ken Death Gets Out of Jail (1985) 3 min, 16 mm black and white
 Five Ways to Kill Yourself (1986) 3 min, 16 mm black and white
 Thanksgiving Prayer (1991) 2 min, 35 mm color, written by and starring William S. Burroughs
 Four Boys in a Volvo (1996) 4min, color
 Paris, je t'aime (2006) segment "Le Marais"
 To Each His Own Cinema (2007) segment "First Kiss" (3 min)
 8 (2008) segment "Mansion on the Hill"

Music videos
 "Thanksgiving Prayer" by William Burroughs (1990)
 "Fame '90" by David Bowie (1990)
 "I'm Seventeen" by Tommy Conwell & The Young Rumblers (1991)
 "Under the Bridge" by Red Hot Chili Peppers (1992)
 "Bang Bang Bang" by Tracy Chapman (1992)
 "Runaway" by Deee-Lite (1992)
 "The Last Song" by Elton John (1992)
 "San Francisco Days" by Chris Isaak (1993)
 "Just Keep Me Moving" by k.d. lang (1993)
 "Creep" (alternative version) by Stone Temple Pilots (1993)
 "Understanding" by Candlebox (1995)
 "Ballad of the Skeletons" by Allen Ginsberg with Paul McCartney, Philip Glass, Lenny Kaye et al. (1996)
 "Weird" by Hanson (1998)
 "Who Did You Think I Was" (turntable version) by John Mayer Trio (2005)
 "Desecration Smile" by Red Hot Chili Peppers (2007)
 "Ain't it Funny" by Danny Brown (2016)

Recordings
 The Elvis of Letters (1985) with William S. Burroughs
 Millions of Images (1990) with William S. Burroughs

Actor
 Jay and Silent Bob Strike Back (2001) as Himself
 Entourage- Season 5, Episode 12: Return to Queens Blvd. (2008) as Himself
 The Canyons (2013) as Dr. Campbell

Television
 The Devil You Know (2015) – Director, executive producer
 When We Rise'' (2017), an American miniseries written by Dustin Lance Black – Director of first two-hour part
Boss Season1 Ep 1 Director

See also
 List of LGBT people from Portland, Oregon
 List of people from the Louisville metropolitan area
 List of Rhode Island School of Design people

References

Further reading

External links

 
 
 
 

1952 births
Living people
American people of Dutch descent
Artists from Oregon
Censorship in the arts
Cannes Film Festival Award for Best Director winners
Directors of Palme d'Or winners
American gay artists
American gay writers
German-language film directors
American LGBT screenwriters
Writers from Louisville, Kentucky
Rhode Island School of Design alumni
Photographers from Oregon
Film directors from Oregon
LGBT people from Oregon
LGBT people from Kentucky
English-language film directors
Film directors from Kentucky
Catlin Gabel School alumni
Filmmakers from Portland, Oregon
Darien High School alumni
LGBT film directors
People from Los Feliz, Los Angeles